Simhapuri Simham is a 1983 Telugu film directed by Kodi Ramakrishna. The film stars Chiranjeevi, Madhavi, Radhika and Gollapudi Maruthi Rao in important roles.

Plot

Cast
Chiranjeevi as Rajashekaram & Vijay (dual role)
Radhika as Rajashekaram's wife
Madhavi as Vijay's girlfriend
Gollapudi Maruthirao as brother of Rajashekaram

Soundtrack 

The soundtrack was composed by J. V. Raghavulu while the lyrics were written by C. Narayana Reddy and Rajasri.

References

External links

1983 films
1980s Telugu-language films
Films directed by Kodi Ramakrishna
Films scored by J. V. Raghavulu